The discography of American Christian hip hop artist Andy Mineo, formerly known as C-Lite, consists of three studio albums, three mixtapes, one compilation album, twenty-one singles, including seven as a featured performer, fourteen music videos, including six as a featured artist, and fifteen guest appearances on various albums. Originally from Syracuse, Mineo initially achieved success as a producer in Upstate New York, and was a member of the hip hop group Fat Camp, signed to Syracuse University's Marshall Street Records. After moving to New York City where he re-dedicated his life to Christ, he closed down his production studio and restarted his career. He released his first mixtape Sin is Wack Vol. 1 in 2009. After providing sung vocals for the song "Background" by Lecrae from the album Rehab, he experienced a surge in popularity and became highly sought after for collaborations. His 2011 single "In My City" featuring Efrain from Doubledge also garnered attention, as did his appearance on the song "Reverse" by Tedashii from Blacklight. He signed to Reach Records in 2011 and dropped his stage name "C-Lite" in favor of his legal name. Under this name he released another mixtape, Formerly Known, in 2011. In May 2012 he debuted a four episode web series entitled Saturday Morning Car-Tunez in which he remixed classic hip hop songs. The four songs were subsequently released for free as a compilation album. His debut full-length studio album, Heroes for Sale, was released April 2013.

Albums

Studio albums

Note: Beginning in 2015, Billboard rendered most hip hop/rap albums ineligible for the Gospel charts

Collaborative albums

Mixtapes

Compilation albums

Extended plays

Singles

As lead artist

As featured artist

Note: Beginning in 2015, Billboard rendered most hip hop/rap albums ineligible for the Gospel charts

Other charted songs 

Note: Beginning in 2015, Billboard rendered most hip hop/rap albums ineligible for the Gospel charts

Guest appearances

Music videos

As lead artist

As featured performer

Notes

References

Hip hop discographies
Discographies of American artists
Christian music discographies